As established and defined by the Kentucky Constitution, the government of the Commonwealth of Kentucky is composed of three branches: the Executive, Judicial, and Legislative.

Executive Branch

The executive branch is headed by the governor, who serves as both the head of state and government. The lieutenant governor themselves does not hold execute authority, though they can if they are also the member of the cabinet. Under the current Kentucky Constitution, the lieutenant governor assumes the duties of the governor only if the governor is incapacitated and cannot perform their duties. Before 1992, the lieutenant governor took to power any time the governor was out of the state. The governor and lieutenant governor usually run on a single ticket, as per a 1992 constitutional amendment, and are elected to four-year terms. The current governor is Andy Beshear, and the lieutenant governor is Jacqueline Coleman, both of whom are Democrats.

The executive branch is, organized into the following "cabinets", each headed by a secretary who is also a member of the governor's cabinet:

 General Government Cabinet
 Transportation Cabinet
 Cabinet for Economic Development
 Finance and Administration Cabinet
 Tourism, Arts, and Heritage Cabinet
 Education and Workforce Development Cabinet
 Cabinet for Health and Family Services
 Justice and Public Safety Cabinet
 Personnel Cabinet
 Labor Cabinet
 Energy and Environment Cabinet
 Public Protection Cabinet

The cabinet system was introduced in 1972 by Governor Wendell Ford to consolidate hundreds of government entities that reported directly to the governor's office.

Other elected offices in the Kentucky Constitution include the Secretary of State, Attorney General, Auditor of Public Accounts, State Treasurer, and Commissioner of Agriculture. Currently, Republican Michael G. Adams serves as the Secretary of State. The commonwealth's chief prosecutor, law enforcement officer, and law officer, is the Attorney General, currently Republican Daniel Cameron. The Auditor of Public Accounts is Republican Mike Harmon. Republican Allison Ball is the current Treasurer. Republican Ryan Quarles is the current Commissioner of Agriculture.

Legislative Branch

Kentucky's legislative branch consists of a bicameral body known as the Kentucky General Assembly.

The Senate is considered the upper house of the General Assembly; it has 38 members and is led by the President of the Senate, currently Robert Stivers (R).

The House of Representatives has 100 members, and is led by the Speaker of the House - currently David Osborne of the Republican Party.

In November 2016, Republicans won control of the house for the first time since 1922, and they currently have supermajorities in both the House and Senate.

Judicial Branch

The judicial branch of Kentucky is called the Kentucky Court of Justice and comprises courts of limited jurisdiction called District Courts; courts of general jurisdiction called Circuit Courts; specialty courts such as Drug Court and Family Court; an intermediate appellate court, the Kentucky Court of Appeals; and a court of last resort, the Kentucky Supreme Court.

The Kentucky Court of Justice is headed by the Chief Justice of the Commonwealth. The chief justice is appointed by and is an elected member of the Supreme Court of Kentucky. The current chief justice is John D. Minton Jr.

Unlike federal judges, who are usually appointed, justices serving on Kentucky state courts are chosen by the electorate in non-partisan elections.

Federal Representation

Kentucky's two U.S. Senators are Senate Minority Leader Mitch McConnell and Rand Paul, both Republicans. The state is divided into six Congressional Districts, represented by Republicans James Comer (1st), Brett Guthrie (2nd), Thomas Massie (4th), Hal Rogers (5th), and Andy Barr (6th), and Democrat Morgan McGarvey (3rd).

In the federal judiciary, Kentucky is served by two United States district courts: the Eastern District of Kentucky, with its primary seat in Lexington, and the Western District of Kentucky, with its primary seat in Louisville. Appeals are heard in the Court of Appeals for the Sixth Circuit, based in Cincinnati, Ohio.

Law

Kentucky's body of laws, known as the Kentucky Revised Statutes (KRS), was enacted in 1942 to better organize and clarify the whole of Kentucky law. The statutes are enforced by local police, sheriffs and deputy sheriffs, and constables and deputy constables. Unless they have completed a police academy elsewhere, these officers must complete Police Officer Professional Standards (POPS) training at the Kentucky Department of Criminal Justice Training Center on the campus of Eastern Kentucky University in Richmond. In 1948, the Kentucky General Assembly established the Kentucky State Police, making it the 38th state to create a force whose jurisdiction extends throughout the given state.

Kentucky is one of the 32 states in the United States that sanctions the death penalty for certain murders defined as heinous. Those convicted of capital crimes after March 31, 1998, are always executed by lethal injection; those convicted on or before this date may opt for the electric chair. Only three people have been executed in Kentucky since the U.S. Supreme Court re-instituted the practice in 1976. The most notable execution in Kentucky was that of Rainey Bethea on August 14, 1936. Bethea was publicly hanged in Owensboro for the rape and murder of Lischia Edwards. Irregularities with the execution led to this becoming the last public execution in the United States.

Kentucky has been on the front lines of the debate over displaying the Ten Commandments on public property. In the 2005 case of McCreary County v. ACLU of Kentucky, the U.S. Supreme Court upheld the decision of the Sixth Circuit Court of Appeals that a display of the Ten Commandments in the Whitley City courthouse of McCreary County was unconstitutional. Later that year, Judge Richard Fred Suhrheinrich, writing for the Sixth Circuit Court of Appeals in the case of ACLU of Kentucky v. Mercer County, wrote that a display including the Mayflower Compact, the Declaration of Independence, the Ten Commandments, Magna Carta, The Star-Spangled Banner, and the national motto could be erected in the Mercer County courthouse.

Kentucky has also been known to have unusually high political candidacy age laws, especially compared to surrounding states. The origin of this is unknown, but it has been suggested it has to do with the commonwealth tradition.

A 2008 study found Kentucky's Supreme Court to be the least influential high court in the nation, with its decisions rarely being followed by other states.

Politics

Politics in Kentucky has historically been very competitive. The state leaned toward the Democratic Party during the 1860s after the Whig Party dissolved. During the Civil War, the southeastern part of the state aligned with the Union and tended to support Republican candidates thereafter, while the central and western portions remained heavily Democratic even into the following decades. Kentucky would be part of the Democratic Solid South until the mid-20th century.

Since 1952, voters in the Commonwealth supported the three Democratic candidates elected to the White House, all from Southern states: Lyndon B. Johnson from Texas in 1964, Jimmy Carter from Georgia in 1976, and Bill Clinton from Arkansas in 1992 and 1996. But by the 21st century, the state had become a Republican stronghold in federal elections, supporting that party's presidential candidates by double-digit margins since 2000. At the same time, voters have continued to elect Democratic candidates to state and local offices in many jurisdictions.  Mirroring the broader national partisan realignment, Kentucky's Democratic Party in the 21st century primarily consists of liberal whites, African-Americans, and other racial minorities. As of March 2020, 48.42 percent of the state's voters were officially registered as Democrats, while 42.75 percent were registered Republicans, whose members tend to be conservative whites. Some 8.83 percent were registered with another political party or as Independents. Despite the Democratic voter registration advantage, the state has elected Republican candidates for federal office routinely since the beginning of the 21st century.

From 1964 through 2004, Kentucky voted for the eventual winner of the Presidential election each time, until losing its bellwether status in the 2008 election. That year Republican John McCain won Kentucky, carrying it 57 percent to 41 percent, but lost the national popular and electoral votes to Democrat Barack Obama. Further hampering Kentucky's status as a bellwether state, 116 of Kentucky's 120 counties supported Republican Mitt Romney in the 2012 election, who lost to Barack Obama nationwide.

Kentucky is one of the most anti-abortion states in the U.S. A 2014 poll done by the Pew Research Center found that 57 percent of those polled in the state thought that abortion should be illegal in all or most cases, while only 36 percent thought that abortion should be legal in all or most cases.

References 

 
 
Kentucky